John Whitlinger (born February 4, 1954) is a former professional tennis player from the United States.

Playing career
Whitlinger played in 10 majors in his career. He won one doubles title in his career.

Career finals

Doubles (1–6)

Coaching career
Whitlinger coached the Stanford men's tennis team as an associate from 1987 to 2004, and as head coach from 2005 until his retirement in 2014. He coached KC Corkery and Sam Worburg to the 2004 NCAA Doubles Championship and Bradley Klahn to the 2010 NCAA Singles Championship.

Personal
Whitlinger's son J.J. (John Jr.) Whitlinger is a men's tennis coach at Furman University. He has two nieces who are professional tennis players, Teri and Tami Whitlinger, and he is the son of former professional basketball player Warren Whitlinger.

Honors and awards
 1997 ITA National Associate Coach of the Year
Fox River Valley Tennis Hall of Fame Class of 1998
 ITA Collegiate Hall of Fame Class of 1999
 2006 Pac-10 Coach of the Year
 USTA Midwest Section Hall of Fame Class of 2010
 Neenah High School Hall of Fame Class of 2015
 Stanford Athletic Hall of Fame

References

External links
 
 

1954 births
Living people
American male tennis players
Sportspeople from Neenah, Wisconsin
Stanford Cardinal men's tennis coaches
Stanford Cardinal men's tennis players
Tennis people from Wisconsin
American tennis coaches